Íslenskir kóngar ('Icelandic Kings') is a 2012 novel by Einar Már Guðmundsson, published by Mál og Menning, in Reykjavík.

Summary

The novel is a satire of the ups and downs of the petty aristocracies of rural twentieth-century Iceland, depicting the fortunes of the imaginary Knudsen dynasty in the fictional fishing town of Tangavík, supposedly situated on the south coast of Iceland, near the Vestmannaeyjar. The dynasty's intertwined relationships with the right-wing Independence Party (usually referred to simply as 'The Party'), its widespread alcoholism, and the criminal activities it undertakes under the Party's shelter, are key themes. The novel involves a large cast, most of whom are represented in the family tree above. However, it focuses on the charismatic Arnfinnur Knudsen, born in 1930 at the beginning of the Great Depression, and dying on 6 October 2008, the day of Geir Haarde's infamous 'Guð blessi Ísland' speech, which marked the beginning of the 2008–2011 Icelandic financial crisis. The story is narrated by an ex-student of Arnfinnur's who despite his own left-wing convictions provides an adulatory account of his former mentor. The tone is one of somewhat rambling reminiscence, with repetition, poorly explained family relationships, and anecdotes all important features of the style.

Translations

 Islandske konger, trans. by Erik Skyum-Nielsen (København: Lindhardt og Ringhof, 2013) ; 2nd edn 2016, ; 9788711485828 [Danish]
 Isländische Könige, trans. by Betty Wahl (München: btb, 2016),  [German]
 Kungar av Island, trans. by Inge Knutsson (Stockholm: Natur & Kultur, 2015),  [Swedish]

References

2012 novels
Icelandic novels
Novels set in Iceland
Icelandic-language novels
Mál og menning books